Evonne Goolagong and Peggy Michel were the defending champions, but lost in the second round to Sue Barker and Glynis Coles.

Ann Kiyomura and Kazuko Sawamatsu defeated Françoise Dürr and Betty Stöve in the final, 7–5, 1–6, 7–5 to win the ladies' doubles tennis title at the 1975 Wimbledon Championships.

Seeds

  Goolagong /  Peggy Michel (second round)
  Rosie Casals /  Billie Jean King (semifinals)
  Chris Evert /  Martina Navrátilová (quarterfinals)
  Margaret Court /  Virginia Wade (quarterfinals)

Draw

Finals

Top half

Section 1

Section 2

Bottom half

Section 3

Section 4

References

External links

1975 Wimbledon Championships – Women's draws and results at the International Tennis Federation

Women's Doubles
Wimbledon Championship by year – Women's doubles
Wimbledon Championships
Wimbledon Championships